The Dendrobatoidea are a superfamily of frogs.

Taxonomy
Families:
Aromobatidae (Grant et al., 2006)
Dendrobatidae (Cope, 1865)

References

 
Vertebrate superfamilies
Taxa named by Edward Drinker Cope